The 2015 OFC U-17 Championship was the 16th edition of the biennial international youth football tournament organized by the Oceania Football Confederation (OFC) for players aged 17 and below. The tournament was held in American Samoa and Samoa from 13 to 26 January 2015.

New Zealand won the tournament and qualified as the OFC representative for the 2015 FIFA U-17 World Cup in Chile.

Participating teams
All 11 eligible teams participated in the tournament. It is only the second time all 11 OFC member associations have entered an Oceania competition since 2006.

 (co-hosts)

 (co-hosts)

Venues

Squads

Group stage
The draw of the tournament was held on 18 November 2014, with each group played as a round-robin tournament. The top two teams from each group advance to the semi-finals.

Group A
All matches were played in Samoa.

Group B
All matches were played in American Samoa.

Note: The last round of matches were moved from Pago Park Soccer Stadium to Kanana Fou Theological Seminary due to wet weather and deteriorating pitch conditions.

Knock-out stage
All matches were played in American Samoa.

Bracket

Semi-finals

Third place match

Final
No extra time was played. New Zealand won the fifth title in a row and qualified for the 2015 FIFA U-17 World Cup, while Tahiti lost for the final for the fourth time in five years.

Awards
The Golden Ball Award is awarded to the most outstanding player of the tournament. The Golden Glove Award is awarded to the best goalkeeper of the tournament. The Golden Boot Award is awarded to the top scorer of the tournament. The Fair Play Award is awarded to the team with the best disciplinary record at the tournament.

Goalscorers
13 goals
 Larry Zama

12 goals
 Michel Maihi

11 goals

 Logan Rogerson
 Sylvain Worworbu

6 goals
 Abednigo Sau

5 goals

 Henri Boucheron
 Joris Kenon
 Jamie Woodlock
 Heirauarii Salem

4 goals

 Simeli Batiratu
 Connor Probert
 Rainui Nordman
 Ronaldo Wilkins

3 goals

 Fazeem Khan
 Joseph Hnagone
 Jack Anderson
 James McGarry
 Oswald Bade
 Junior Hou
 Honoarii Kohumoetini
 Marc Siejidr

2 goals

 Marino Akapo
 Nelson Kaï
 Etienne Poanoui
 Ben Kiore
 Benjamin Mata
 Brendon Kambula
 Freddy Tupani
 Samualu Malo
 Frank Mariner
 David Wensley
 Hendrick Jirah
 Philip Maeta
 Richard Raramo
 Soakai Vea
 Frederick Massing
 Max Unuga

1 goal

 Samuel Koiatu
 Rouruina Mariri
 France Catarogo
 Muni Reddy
 Maxime Betoulle
 Jimmy Guseal
 Jean-Marc Kaudre
 Oliver Ceci
 Luke Johnson
 Sean Skeens
 Sam Wilson
 Stahl Gubag
 Martin Tokwakwasi
 Mose Sofala
 Kaliz Atu
 Benjimin Toata
 Mauri Heitaa
 Joachim Tenuanua
 Keali Wong
 Aisea Muli
 William Edison
 Xavier Jimmy
 Simeon Joshua
 Nicky Obed

Own goals
 (2: 1 against  and 1 against )
 (2: Bronson Lotu-I'iga against  and 1 against )
 (1 against )
 (Sam Tiaou against )
 (Luke Johnson against )
 (1 against )
 (1 against )
 (1 against )

References

External links
OFC U-17 Men's Championship 2015, oceaniafootball.com

   
2015
U-17 Championship
2015 in American Samoan sports
2015 in Samoan sport
International association football competitions hosted by American Samoa
International association football competitions hosted by Samoa
2015 in youth association football
January 2015 sports events in Oceania